This is a list of episodes for the television series Major Dad.

Series overview

Episodes

Season 1 (1989–90)

Season 2 (1990–91)

Season 3 (1991–92)

Season 4 (1992–93)

References

External links

Lists of American sitcom episodes